Valley was a rural district part of the administrative county of Anglesey, Wales from 1894 to 1974.

The district was formed by the Local Government Act of 1894 as the successor to Holyhead Rural Sanitary District. It took its name from the village of Valley which lay at the district centre.

The rural district was abolished in 1974, when the Local Government Act 1972 amalgamated all local authorities on the island into the single district of Ynys Môn – Isle of Anglesey.

List of civil parishes 
 Aberffraw
 Bodedern
 Bodwrog
 Ceirchiog
 Cerrigceinwen
 Henegwlys
 Llanddeusant
 Llandrygan
 Llanfaelog
 Llanfaethlu
 Llanfair yn Neubwll
 Llanfwrog
 Llangwyfan
 Llanfihangel-yn-Nhowyn
 Llanllibio
 Llanrhuddlad
 Llantrisant
 Llanyngenedl
 Llechylched
 Rhoscolyn
 Trewalchmai

External links

Valley Rural District Council records (Archives Network Wales), accessed January 23, 2008

Rural districts of Wales
History of Anglesey
1894 establishments in Wales